Gülberk Gültekin (born 4 April 1974) is a Turkish former professional female tennis player.

Gültekin has won 2 singles and 3 doubles titles on the ITF circuit in her career. On 11 September 1995, she reached her best singles ranking of world number 391. On 21 August 1995, she peaked at world number 451 in the doubles rankings.

Playing for Turkey at the Fed Cup, Gültekin has a win–loss record of 24–28.

Gültekin retirement from tennis 2005.

ITF Circuit finals

Singles: 4 (2–2)

Doubles: 7 (3-4)

References

External links 
 
 
 

1974 births
Living people
Sportspeople from Trabzon
Turkish female tennis players
Mediterranean Games bronze medalists for Turkey
Competitors at the 1997 Mediterranean Games
Mediterranean Games medalists in tennis
20th-century Turkish sportswomen